Newington is a village and civil parish in the English county of Kent located  north-west of Folkestone. It gives its name to Newington-Shepway Parish Council, which has five councillors, and includes the hamlets of Arpinge and Beachborough. The village lies to the north of the M20 motorway and the A20 road; the Channel Tunnel complex is nearby.

The ecclesiastical parish was known as Newington-next-Hythe, the latter town being  to the south-west; the parish church is dedicated to St Nicholas. Nearby there used to be a 13th-century Augustinian priory, founded in 1253 by Sir John Maunsell, who became a counsellor of King Henry III.

The parish includes the hamlet of Peene which was joined to the Elham Valley Railway. Although no station existed at Peene, the railway passed over a bridge in the village. The village is now home to the Elham Valley Railway Museum.

References

External links

Villages in Kent
Civil parishes in Kent
Folkestone and Hythe District